San Marino was represented by 2 athletes at the 2010 European Athletics Championships held in Barcelona, Spain.

Participants

Results

Men
Track and road events

Women
Track and road events

References 
Participants list (men)
Participants list (women)

Nations at the 2010 European Athletics Championships
2010
European Athletics Championships